Kent Falls State Park is a public recreation area located in the town of Kent, Connecticut, within the Litchfield Hills region of the southern Berkshires. The state park is home to Kent Falls, a series of waterfalls on Falls Brook, a tributary of the Housatonic River. The falls drop  in under a quarter mile. The largest cascade drops more than  into a reflecting pool, before traveling over the lesser falls.

History
The Indian name of the falls is Scatacook, and there is evidence that the area was used by Native Americans for fishing and camping. Mills stood along the brook during colonial times. Kent Falls was established as a state park after  of land was given to the state in 1919 as a gift from the White Memorial Foundation. Workers with the Civil Works Administration contributed to the park's development in the 1930s.

In the 1970s, trail reconstruction was done by the Youth Conservation Corps of America. In 2006, observation platforms were constructed along a trail next to the falls; at the base of the falls, a terraced observation area paved with native flag stones was created to allow access to a calm-water wading pool.

Activities and amenities
The park has a replica of a covered bridge that allows visitors to cross the brook and access the falls. In addition to its scenery, the park offers hiking, fishing, and picnicking.

References

External links
Kent Falls State Park Connecticut Department of Energy and Environmental Protection
Kent Falls State Park Map Connecticut Department of Energy and Environmental Protection

Kent, Connecticut
State parks of Connecticut
Waterfalls of Connecticut
Parks in Litchfield County, Connecticut
Landforms of Litchfield County, Connecticut
Protected areas established in 1919
1919 establishments in Connecticut
Land Gifts of the White Memorial Foundation